RCW may refer to

 Rare Coin Wholesalers 
 Ramial Chipped Wood 
 Runtime Callable Wrapper in Microsoft Component Object Model and .NET interoperability
 Revolutionary Championship Wrestling, a professional wrestling promotion
 RCW Catalogue, an astronomical catalogue
 Revised Code of Washington, laws and statutes effective in the jurisdiction of Washington state
 Return to Castle Wolfenstein, a video game originally published in 2001
 Red cockaded woodpecker, an endangered woodpecker native to the southeastern United States.
 Riot City Wrestling, a professional wrestling promotion
 Russian Civil War, a civil war that took place between 1918–20 following the 1917 Russian Revolution
 Rwandan Civil War, a conflict in Rwanda between 1990–1994